Whitney Creek drains Whitney Lake and flows west before emptying into Mud Lake in Hamilton County, New York.

References

Rivers of New York (state)
Rivers of Hamilton County, New York